Stinchfield is a surname. Notable people with the surname include:

Augustus Stinchfield (1842-1917), American physician
Frederick Harold Stinchfield (1881–1950), American attorney 
Roxana Stinchfield Ferris (1895–1978), American botanist
Sara Mae Stinchfield Hawk (1885–1977), American speech therapist